The 2011 Velayat Cup was a friendly football tournament that took place in Tehran in the Iran in November 2011.

Participating teams
Totally 3 teams get permission to participate in the tournament "2011 Velayat Cup". 
 Persepolis from ( Iran)
 Nacional from ( Paraguay)
 Esteghlal from ( Iran)

Standings

Matches

Statistics

Top scorers

Cards

References

See also 
 2011–12 Persian Gulf Cup
 2011–12 Azadegan League
 2011–12 Hazfi Cup
 2011–12 Iran Football's 2nd Division
 2011–12 Iran Football's 3rd Division
 Iranian Super Cup
 2011–12 Iranian Futsal Super League

2011–12 in Iranian football
2011 in Paraguayan football
2011
2011